Erik Törnros (born 11 June 1993) is a Swedish footballer who plays for Italian club Via Artena

Career
He previously played at HB Køge and Dalkurd.

On 4 August 2016, Törnros signed for PS Kemi on loan for the remainder of the season.

Törnros signed for FC Lahti in Finland on 21 December 2018. He signed a 2-year contract.

Tornros signed for AC Nardò in the Italian Serie D on november 2020. He signed a 1-year contract.

References

External links

Elitefootball Profile

1993 births
Living people
Swedish footballers
Swedish expatriate footballers
Association football forwards
Gefle IF players
IK Brage players
Dalkurd FF players
Kemi City F.C. players
GKS Tychy players
HB Køge players
FC Lahti players
Allsvenskan players
Superettan players
Veikkausliiga players
I liga players
Danish 1st Division players
Serie D players
Swedish expatriate sportspeople in Finland
Swedish expatriate sportspeople in Poland
Swedish expatriate sportspeople in Denmark
Swedish expatriate sportspeople in Italy
Expatriate footballers in Finland
Expatriate footballers in Poland
Expatriate men's footballers in Denmark
Expatriate footballers in Italy